Fields Peak is a small but distinctive peak  southeast of Brandenberger Bluff on the lower northern slopes of Mount Berlin, in Marie Byrd Land, Antarctica.

References 

Mountains of Marie Byrd Land